RallyCross, also known as RallyX, is a type of car competition in the United States and Canada, sanctioned by Sports Car Club of America (SCCA). It is a timed event that involves solo driving on grass or dirt and can be considered "autocross on the dirt." As with autocross, the emphasis is on driver skill and handling rather than absolute speed, with frequent corners generally keeping speeds below 60 mph (100 km/h).  In many ways RallyCross is to rally racing as autocross is to road racing.

Influences 
The American form of RallyCross has many influences.  The name itself implies falsely a close connection with the European Rallycross format, since 2010 in the United States driven under the tag RallyCar U.S. Rallycross, where up to six cars race side by side on a prepared mixed-terrain circuit.  RallyCross also has close ties to competition stage rally.  It is often looked to as an inexpensive primer for stage competition.  RallyCross is much safer (due to the lower speeds, separation from other vehicles, and closer proximity to aid) and less expensive environment to develop or perfect driving skills that World Rally Championship or Paris-Dakar Rally drivers use.

Events

Planning
SCCA RallyCross events are planned months in advance.  A SCCA RallyCross must be run on a large open piece of ground free of hazardous debris such as large rocks and trees.  Courses are laid out with pylons (cones) and typically are 30–90 seconds in time. Speeds don't see higher than highway speeds and going higher than 2nd gear is a rarity. 
Throughout the day of competition the surface quality is likely to change drastically as gravel or dirt is worn away and ruts are created and deepened or even as snow and ice melt. It is because of these requirements that finding a location for an event is sometimes the most difficult part of event planning.  When a site is chosen and the appropriate paperwork (including sanctioning and insurance) is filled out 
the next step is site preparation.  The site must be further prepared by removing debris and planning the course for race day.

Working
On the day of the event the cones that will outline the course are laid out and any last minute adjustments are made.  There are many jobs to be done during the competition itself.  The organizers are responsible for assigning jobs to the appropriate people and seeing that they get done.  Before any of the cars are allowed on course they must go through a technical-safety inspection which is handled by a tech inspector (also known as a scrutineer).  This person must be familiar with how to check the safety of a vehicle (tech inspections do not check for car compliance).  A group of people must also work in timing and scoring, keeping all the day's times straight. The last and most visible job is that of the corner worker.  This position is almost always filled by the racers that are not racing during a given heat (round of competition).  Corner workers are in charge of replacing knocked over cones and reporting the penalty to timing and scoring and in some cases may be required to tell a driver to stop in the case of an emergency.

Scoring
Often the layout of the course will change throughout the day as the course must move away from dangerous ruts and other obstacles that are formed by the cars during competition.  Each run made on the course could be drastically different than the last for a given driver.  Instead of taking the best time out of a number of runs, the times for each run are summed together.  Added to this time is an additional 2 seconds for every cone the car hit and 10 seconds for any gate that was missed.  The winner is determined by the lowest combined time.  RallyCross events have one car on course with no wheel to wheel or pass other cars.  This process is similar to the timing for stage rally with individual runs over the same course instead of varying special stages.

Classes
SCCA RallyCross events are open to all closed-top production based automobiles that are capable of passing a simple technical inspection.  The vehicles are classed by drive train, modifications allowed, and in some cases power.  The SCCA’s guidelines for vehicle classification are as follows:

Stock
This category is for cars that are nearly stock with very few upgrade allowances.  A cat-back exhaust and the replacement of consumable items, such as tires and brake pads with street legal replacements, are allowed.  The category is further broken down into:

Prepared
Prepared is the category above Rally Stock.  All Rally Stock modifications are allowed with the addition of more modification allowances to the suspension as well as the intake and exhaust.  Any type and size of wheels and tires are allowed in this category.  Prepared is broken down further into:

Modified
This category includes most vehicles not in the other two.  In 2012 the former Modified 2WD class was split into Modified RWD and Modified FWD, though some regions still use the old M2 classing. Modifications are fairly unrestricted, allowing for any suspension (including any changes in suspension geometry) and the use of any internal combustion engine.  Most log booked race cars fall under this category.  With these allowances this open class is the most competitive class in RallyCross.  The category is divided into:

Constructor 
This category was officially recognized in 2018 to allow vehicles other than standard production vehicles, such as Dune Buggies, Sandrails, Kit Cars, fabricated tube-frame vehicles and other custom built vehicles to enter RallyCross competition.  In 2022, the rulebook was amended to include vehicles modified "in excess of the Modified Category requirements."  Like the previous 3 categories, the Constructor class is separated, but only into two-wheel-drive and four-wheel-drive classes, with no distinction between front-wheel-drive and rear-wheel-drive.

Side-By-Side / UTV 
In 2019, a class was introduced to allow side-by-side recreational vehicles (also known as Utility Task Vehciles or UTVs) to compete in RallyCross events. At this time, there are no sub-categories of the UTV class.

SCCA future plans

2014 Saw its 10th year of National level competition and its 8th National Championship in Greenwood, NE. 2015 will see the 9th National Championship being held at the site of the National Balloon Classic in Indianola, IA. 
2007 marked the formation of The RallyCross National Challenge Series and RallyCross National Championship.  This is the most structure that has been brought to SCCA RallyCross since its birth.  The inaugural championship is scheduled for October at Motorsports Park Hastings in Nebraska.  The national championship brings with it divisional championships as well as a points format.  It seems that the SCCA has intentions of keeping and expanding RallyCross for future seasons.

The 2010 SCCA RallyCross National Championship was  held August 20–22 in Fountain, CO.

References

http://www.scca.com/rallycross/

External links 
 
 Central Florida Region RallyCross
 Land O' Lakes Region RallyCross
 Finger Lakes Region RallyCross
 Glen Region RallyCross
 SCCA RallyCross Videos
 New England Region RallyCross
  Oregon Rally Group
 Western Ohio Region Rallycross
 Washington DC Region RallyCross
 West Coast Rally Association
 Pros of SCCA RallyCross

Auto racing series in the United States
Sports Car Club of America
Rallycross racing series